Kanal 5 is a national, privately owned, television channel in the Republic of North Macedonia. It was founded in its current form in 1998. The network's main office is in Skopje, and also has smaller studios in other bigger cities all around North Macedonia.

The network began broadcasting to the coverage area of Skopje with fifty employees before expanding reach to the rest of the country. Kanal 5 has publicly had a strong aim of being a part of every household. Kanal 5 TV (Channel 5 TV) currently has an audience reach of 96% of the Macedonian population. However, its new "sister" channel Kanal 5 plus currently has an audience reach of 76% of the Macedonian population.

From August 2009 until June 2012, Kanal 5 TV was the exclusive Macedonian broadcaster of all football matches from the UEFA Champions League, the UEFA Europa League and UEFA Super Cup.

In May 2010, Kanal 5 started its own HD programme, called "Kanal 5 HD", on the national IPTV operator, T-Home's Max TV.

Канал 5 Вести (Kanal 5 News) is the stations news division. The networks flagship evening and latenight news bulletins are presented by Tatjana Stojanovska, Borislav Tnokovski, Elizabeta Galevska or Maja Damjanovska. Morning shows are presented by Robert Jankov, Milena Antovska, Biljana Debarlieva, Ljubica Janevska, Vane Markovski, Jelena Spendzarska and Anastasija Bogdanska. Morning news bulletins are presented by Aleksandar Petreski. The networks Chief News Editor is Lidija Bogatinova.

External links
Kanal 5 at LyngSat Address

Television channels in North Macedonia
Television channels and stations established in 1998
1998 establishments in the Republic of Macedonia